Felinfoel RFC is a Welsh rugby union club representing the town of Felinfoel, Llanelli, West Wales. Felinfoel RFC is a member of the Welsh Rugby Union and is a feeder club for Llanelli Scarlets.

Club honours
 WRU Division Two West - 2007/08 - Champions. (Perfect season, 22 games played - 22 games won)

Notable former players
The following players have represented Felinfoel and have been capped at senior international level
 Phil Bennett OBE, (29 caps), British Lions, Wales & Llanelli captain.
 Brian Butler, Wales Youth, Llanelli & Bradford Northern Rugby League
 William Harries "Bill" Clement (6 caps)
 Brinley E. Evans
 Bryn Evans
 Ian Stuart Gallacher, Llanelli, Wales Youth, Wales, Bradford Northern,R.L.
 Elvet Jones
 Roy Mathias, Llanelli, Wales Youth, Wales, St.Helens RL & Great Britain Rugby League.
 William "Bill" Morris (3 caps)
 David Nicholas, Wales Schoolboys, Wales Youth, Wales, Llanelli (4 caps)
 Gareth Rees, Glamorgan Cricket
 Colin Stephens, Wales Schoolboys, Wales, Llanelli
 Watcyn Thomas
 Nathaniel "Danny" Walters
 John Douglas Warlow Llanelli, Wales, St.Helens R.L.
 William Watts
 Ossie Williams
 Henry Raymond "Ray" Williams
 Stanley Williams

References

Welsh rugby union teams
Sport in Carmarthenshire